Antonio Alexandru Bordușanu (born 10 August 2004) is a Romanian professional footballer who plays as a right winger for Liga II side Dinamo București.

He entered the history of Dinamo București as the first ever goal-scorer for the team in the second division, in the 1-0 win against Progresul Spartac in August 2022.

Club career

Dinamo București

A product of the Dinamo București academy, he made his senior debut for the club on 26 February 2021, in a 0-5 defeat against Viitorul Constanta, when he replaced Diego Fabbrini in the 89th minute.

During the Liga I 2021-2022 season, he became a first-team regular, especially in the second part of the season, when he was used as the mandatory under-21 player in the team, as required by the rules of the national competition. On 22 February 2022, he was selected in the team of the week by the LPF, after the game against Gaz Metan Mediaș where he scored his first ever senior goal in a 4-0 win. The season finished with the relegation of the team in Liga II, following the defeat in the play-out games against Universitatea Cluj.

Career statistics

Club

References

External links
 
 

2004 births
Living people
Footballers from Bucharest
Romanian footballers
Association football midfielders
Liga I players
Liga III players
FC Dinamo București players